Nikolay Minkov (born 13 August 1997) is a Bulgarian footballer who plays as a midfielder for Botev Plovdiv.

Career
In January 2014, Minkov was included in Cherno More's 25-man squad for their training camp in Turkey. Nikolay made his full first team league début in a 1–2 home defeat against Lokomotiv Plovdiv on 26 May 2015, playing as striker. On 21 May 2017, he scored his first goal for Cherno More in a 1–2 away defeat by Lokomotiv Plovdiv. He won the Man of the match award despite the loss.

On 15 January 2016, Minkov joined Dobrudzha Dobrich on loan for the rest of the 2015–16 B Group season.

Minkov's contract expired at the end of the 2017–18 season and he left the club after refusing to sign an extension.

On 18 June 2018, Minkov signed with Second League club CSKA 1948.

Career statistics

References

External links
 
 

1997 births
Living people
Bulgarian footballers
Bulgaria youth international footballers
Bulgaria under-21 international footballers
Association football midfielders
Association football wingers
PFC Cherno More Varna players
PFC Dobrudzha Dobrich players
FC CSKA 1948 Sofia players
FC Montana players
Botev Plovdiv players
First Professional Football League (Bulgaria) players
Sportspeople from Varna, Bulgaria